The 1988 African Cup of Nations was the 16th edition of the Africa Cup of Nations, the soccer championship of Africa (CAF). It was hosted by Morocco, who replaced original host Zambia. Just like in 1986, the field of eight teams was split into two groups of four. The tournament final was held in Casablanca at Stade Mohamed V. Cameroon won its second championship, beating Nigeria in the final 1−0.

This tournament has the fewest goals-per-game average in Africa Cup of Nations tournaments.

Host selection 
The original host was Zambia but after their withdrawal in December 1986 due to financial issues, the Confederation of African Football approached Algeria which agreed to host the tournament. However, in February
1987 the CAF rescinded this decision following a dispute with Algeria which protested the CAF's decision to order a replay of the first leg match of the 1978 All-Africa Games qualification against Tunisia. CAF had made this decision following Tunisia's protest that Algeria had fielded two professional players.
Morocco was chosen in the end to host the 1988 Africa Cup of Nations replacing Algeria.

Qualified teams 

The 8 qualified teams are:

 
 
 
  (holders)
 
  (hosts)

Squads

Venues 
The competition was played in two venues in Casablanca and Rabat.

Group stage

Group A 

Note: Algeria qualified by drawing of lots.

Group B

Knockout stage

Semifinals

Third place match

Final

Scorers 
2 goals

  Lakhdar Belloumi
  Roger Milla
  Abdoulaye Traoré
  Gamal Abdelhamid

1 goal

  Abdelkader Ferhaoui
  Rachid Maâtar
  Emmanuel Kundé
  Cyrille Makanaky
  Ayman Younes
  Mustafa El Haddaoui
  Abdelkrim Merry
  Hassan Nader
  Humphrey Edobor
  Ndubuisi Okosieme
  Samuel Okwaraji
  Rashidi Yekini
  Eugène Kabongo
  Lutonadio

Own goal

  Abdelrazak Belgharbi (against Nigeria)

CAF Team of the Tournament 
Goalkeeper
  Joseph-Antoine Bell

Defenders
  Tijani El Maataoui
  Emmanuel Kundé
  John Buana
  Stephen Tataw

Midfielders
  Jacques Kinkomba Kingambo
  Emile Mbouh
  Henry Nwosu
  Paul Mfede

Forwards
  Roger Milla
  Aziz Bouderbala

References

External links 
 Details at RSSSF

 
African Cup of Nations, 1988
African Cup Of Nations, 1988
Africa Cup of Nations tournaments
Nations
African Cup of Nations